Zarap railway station is a train station on the Konkan Railway. It is at a distance of  down from origin. The preceding station on the line is Kudal railway station and the next station is Sawantwadi Road railway station.

References

Railway stations along Konkan Railway line
Railway stations in Sindhudurg district
Ratnagiri railway division